Warcry, War cry, WarCry or War Cry may refer to:

 Battle cry, a yell or chant taken up in battle
 Warcry (activist), Priya Reddy, an environmentalist and anarchist
 WarCry (band), a Spanish power metal band 
 WarCry (album), 2002
 WarCry (game), a collectible card game
War Cry (graphic novel), by Jim Butcher
 War Cry (novel), a 2017 novel by Wilbur Smith
 WarCry Network, a web portal centered on MMOGs
 The War Cry, the official newspaper of the Salvation Army